Serena del Mar is a large-scale urban development located on the northern coast of Cartagena, Colombia. The project's master plan calls for residential, retail, commercial, hospitality, recreational, institutional, and educational facilities.  The 1000 hectare (2,472 acres) site is located 12 kilometers from Cartagena’s historic old city and 8 kilometers from Rafael Núñez International Airport.

It is led by the development firm Novus Civitas, which has brought together international urban planners, architects, and landscapers, including EDSA, Moshe Safdie, Wallace Roberts & Todd, Brandon Haw, and Robert Trent Jones II to work on the developments architecture, design, and master plan.

Construction of Phase I of the project began in March 2015.  One of the first projects currently under construction is the Centro Hospitalario Serena del Mar, a 409-bed international medical services university hospital, designed by Moshe Safdie and operated by Fundación Santa Fe De Bogota (a Johns Hopkins Medicine International Affiliate)

Serena del Mar’s master plan contemplates over 20,000 housing units ranging from student housing to single-family homes and multi-family apartment complexes for members of different age groups and socioeconomic levels.
The first phase of these residential projects is currently being developed.

Serena del Mar will also include an educational component. The Serena del Mar educational component will include a public school for approximately 800 students, as well Universidad de los Andes  first satellite campus, designed by Brandon Haw, which will open for classes in 2018.

The Fundación Serena del Mar serves as the development's social foundation and works with the surrounding communities to try and improve quality of life, social development, and the environment. The Fundación Serena del Mar has directly and positively impacted 87% of the surrounding community members through programs based on social development, environmental integration, and revenue generation. The foundation's programs include professional training workshops, educational programs, recreational activities, cultural meet ups, environmental and health conferences, and value formation.

In May 2018 the Universidad de Los Andes campus at Serena del Mar will begin classes. In 2019 the Centro Hospitalario Serena del Mar will begin operations.

References 

Buildings and structures in Colombia